Unión Deportiva Collerense is a football team based in Palma de Mallorca in the autonomous community of Balearic Islands. Founded in 1983, the team plays in Tercera División – Group 11. The club's home ground is Estadio Municipal Coll d’en Rebassa with a 1,000-seat capacity.

History
Originally founded in 1967, UD Collerense were RCD Mallorca's reserve team for the 1981–82 and 1982–83 seasons, both in Tercera División. At conclusion of the latter campaign, the club officially became RCD Mallorca Atlético, and a new UD Collerense was formed shortly after.

Season to season

17 seasons in Tercera División
6 seasons in Reg. Pref.
9 seasons in 1ª Reg
9 seasons in 2ª Reg
1 seasons in 3ª Reg

Women's team
UD Collerense Femenino are the women's section of the team. They played in the highest national league, the Primera División, between 2009 and 2016.

References

External links
Futbolme team profile 
 Unofficial website 

Football clubs in the Balearic Islands
Association football clubs established in 1983
Sport in Palma de Mallorca
1983 establishments in Spain